Parerigone is a genus of flies in the family Tachinidae.

Species
 Parerigone aurea Brauer, 1898
 Parerigone brachyfurca Chao & Zhou, 1990
 Parerigone flavihirta (Chao & Sun, 1990)
 Parerigone huangshanensis (Chao & Sun, 1990)
 Parerigone nigrocauda (Chao & Sun, 1990)
 Parerigone tianmushana Chao & Sun, 1990

References

Tachinidae